Homeobox protein Hox-B7 is a protein that in humans is encoded by the HOXB7 gene.

Function 
This gene is a member of the Antp homeobox family and encodes a protein with a homeobox DNA-binding domain. It is included in a cluster of homeobox B genes located on chromosome 17. The encoded nuclear protein functions as a sequence-specific transcription factor that is involved in cell proliferation and differentiation. Increased expression of this gene is associated with some cases of melanoma and ovarian carcinoma.

Interactions 
HOXB7 has been shown to interact with PBX1 and CREB-binding protein.

See also 
 Homeobox

References

Further reading

External links 
 

Transcription factors